No Need for Bushido is a webcomic started on April 11, 2002, on Keenspace (now Comic Genesis). The comic is drawn by Alex Kolesar and written by Joseph Kovell. Its content and title are based on various influences from such anime and manga as Tenchi Muyo! (which has a series of volumes titled "No Need for Tenchi") and Rurouni Kenshin, a famous manga/anime series which No Need For Bushido parodies at many points. Kolesar's artistic style is influenced by, but not restricted to, the manga and anime styles, while Kovell's writing style is humorous, unique and random. The series is a mixture of anachronism, exaggerated action, veiled drama, and comedy based in a parodied feudal Japan.

Story
No Need for Bushido begins with the announcement of an arranged marriage between Eijiro Wataro and Ina Senshin. Their respective clans are among the most powerful in Japan, and the ambitions of Hirotomo Wataro, the ruthless head of the Wataro clan, for total dominion of Japan has the two clans on the brink of war. The marriage is supposed to serve as both a means to avoid war and unite the two great clans into one.

However, when Ina hears the news she is horrified both by never being consulted about this and at the thought of marrying a member of the brutal and cruel Wataro clan. The headstrong princess runs away from home rather than go through with the marriage, and soon finds herself traveling with a band of odd characters while other events and rising tension between the Wataro and Senshin clans seem to point towards a coming war.

Style
The art style in No Need for Bushido has undergone multiple updates throughout its archive ranging from "cartoonish"

to Manga-like.

The comic's fight scenes seem heavily influenced by action movies.

Plot Details
Chapter 1: The Epic Beginning

Ina discovers that her father, Masuhiro Senshin, has formed a peace treaty with the warlike Wataro clan. To avoid the arranged marriage, Ina runs away in middle of the night.

Chapter 2: Off to Adventure

Ina soon runs into a small group of bandits who threaten to kidnap her. These bandits are stopped when Yorikiro Wataro, the idealistic elder son of Hirotomo Wataro who has left his clan to live as a wandering samurai, appears to save Ina. Yorikiro manages, through luck, to kill two of the four bandits, but his katana is broken in the process. With no means to defend himself, Yori picks up Ina and attempts to escape. The two are forced to jump off a cliff and into a river below. After gaining consciousness from the fall, Ina grudgingly accepts Yorikiro's offer to follow her as a body guard. During introductions, both characters, for different reasons, avoid mentioning their clan names.

Chapter 3: Ninja Death Inn

The two find a small village inn and stay for the night. Ina and Yorikiro switch rooms when Ina finds a rat in her own. Later that night, two ninjas, upon locating Yori's original room on the Inn's register, break into Ina's room by mistake. Yori, alerted by Ina's scream, breaks into her room. Without a working sword, Yorikiro is forced to use his sheath to knock out the first ninja. The second, however, is able to counter his attack and kicks him through a wall into the next room. Yorikiro lands upon Cho Teko, a blind Taoist priest, who offers his assistance. Cho, a martial arts expert, quickly dispatches the second ninja. Yori and Ina leave the inn to avoid further trouble. Cho, lacking any particular goal, decides to join them. Here it is revealed that he is part of a prophecy that states a Christian, Hindu, and blind Taoist priest walk into a Japanese bar, and the world ends. Unfortunately, Cho had managed to accidentally go to Japan. As a devout follower of fate, however, Cho resigns himself to his role in the end of the world.

Chapter 4: Daimyo Switcharoo

Masuhiro Senshin, Ina's father, decides that the best way to avoid war with the Wataro clan is to journey to meet Hirotomo Wataro, personally explain about Ina running away and attempt to continue negotiating peace between the two clans. He appoints his brother in law Yukizane, a skilled strategist and diplomat, to lead the clan in his absence and takes a small group of bodyguards and retainers with him, hoping to make better time that way.

Chapter 5: New Friend or Foe

Yori, Ina, and Cho enter a new town where they plan to stop for the night. Upon entering the town they stop by a tea stand with a long line. Here they meet Ken, a disgruntled Ronin with a large Zanbatō sword. After entering the town, Yori runs off to buy a new blade for his broken sword at a "one yen" store. While the shop keeper attaches the blade, Yorikiro discovers a wakizashi with a retractable blade. He absent-mindedly pockets this item and leaves the store with his new sword. By the time Yorikiro meets up with Ina and Cho, it has been decided that there is only enough money for one room. Yori is left outside to find shelter for himself.

Chapter 6: It's All in the Past

Two bandits (unrelated to those found earlier in the comic) find Ken laying motionless in middle of a small wood outside town. Believing him to be dead, they attempt to steal from him, but soon find that he is quite alive and eager to fight despite their attempts to leave peacefully. The noise alerts Yori who comes to the aid of the clearly outmatched bandits. Yorikiro accidentally reveals his clan name, Wataro. Ken explains that his own clan had been wiped out by Yorikiro's and he intends to get revenge. The bandits are able to run away in the confusion, leaving Yori to face Ken alone. (The resulting fight is one of the first obvious parodies of Rurouni Kenshin). As the fight continues, Yorikiro's sword is broken a second time. He is then slammed against a tree and loses consciousness. When Yori recovers, he mentions that his former trainer Genchu would not wish to see him lose here. Ken is shocked to hear that Yori had known Genchu, a man who had saved him from the destruction that met the rest of his clan. In the process, Genchu had fought General Nataku, the man leading the invasion, and had cut off his pinky finger. Yori explains that he hopes to redeem his clan. Ken decides to join Yorikiro in hopes of obtaining his revenge specifically on General Nataku.

Chapter 7: Ninja Ambush

On his travels, Masuhiro is ambushed in a narrow mountain pass by a group of ninja who slay all his retainers. Masuhiro fights back skillfully, but eventually at the hands of the ninja band's female leader Suzuka, who cuts him with a drug laced weapon. Just before falling into unconsciousness, she reveals that she has been hired by the Wataro clan.

Chapter 8: Politics Suck

Eijiro Wataro visits the Senshin clan to meet his bride to be. Yukizane and Kagome (Masuhiro's wife) manage to excuse Ina's disappearance under the pretenses of illness. Furthermore, Yukizane is surprised to find that Eijiro did not meet Masuhiro while travelling. Eijiro leaves with a warning to the Senshin clan, and reports to his father that, as suspected, the bride has disappeared. He also informs Hirotomo that Masuhiro has gone missing as well, and that Eijiro has located Yorikiro's location. Upon hearing this, Hirotomo summons his four most trusted warriors, the Demons of the Sorrow, and sends them after his Yorikiro.

Chapter 9: Send in the Ninjas

As Ina, Yori, Cho, and Ken travel through a rock quarry, they are accosted by the somewhat incompetent ninja Bunzo, who specializes in rock jutsu. However, his skills seem to primarily involve throwing any available rocks at his opponents, and seem to be no match for Cho, and even less trouble for Ken. After Bunzo runs out of rocks to throw, he decides to make his retreat, but not before revealing that he is a member of the Izuma ninja clan, as well as his threat to throw Mount Fuji itself on his opponents. Bunzo walks away, muttering to himself, and the others find a sign giving them the way to Kyoto.

Meanwhile, Masuhiro is found in a prison, alongside the two surviving bandits from the first chapter. After a brief discussion, Masuhiro manages to free the three of them from the ninja cave. He sends the bandits to find Yorikiro Wataro and warn him about the ninja's intentions, and goes himself to find Suzuka for more information. He finds her bathing, and she manages to get the upper hand on him again, drugging him with another needle, sending him right back into the prison.

Chapter 10: Kyoto Kaos

Chapter 11: Yori's Dead!

Chapter 12: Think Like a Ninja

Chapter 13: Demons vs. Ninjas

Chapter 14: Kabuki Katastrophy

Chapter 15: Brothers in Arms

Chapter 16: Bridge

Chapter 17: Deals in the Dark

While Suzuka confides with the bound Masuhiro that her employer may not be completely trustworthy after all, Masuhiro manages to escape again and be recaptured by Suzuka. The ninja clan, with hostage in tow, meet up with their employer, who turns out to be Eijiro himself. He reveals that he has hired the ninja without his father's knowledge, and that with Masuhiro's death, war will break out between the two clans, and the Wataro clan will take what it deserves without the need for a peace treaty. After the deal is made, Suzuka instructs Ayane to send Masuhiro back to the Senshin clan for a price.

Upon returning to his camp, Eijiro is sent to Nataku, who informs Eijiro that he has been aware of Eijiro dealing behind his father's back. However, Nataku sides with Eijiro, saying that his actions are in the best interest of the Wataro clan.

Chapter 18: Choices

In this flashback chapter, Nataku tells Eijiro of the story of Genchu's return to the Wataro castle. Genchu fights his way past the guards, and eventually makes his way to Hirotomo himself, and the two of them face off. Genchu tells Hirotomo that he intends to kill him, and make Yori the new daimyo.

Meanwhile, Yori and Tadashii, having returned from a study session for a few weeks, find that their soldiers in ruin. The fight between Genchu and Hirotomo continue on, with Genchu the winner. However, Yori and Tadashii happen in on the fight, which distracts Genchu long enough for Hirotomo to turn the fight around.

Hirotomo now has Genchu at his mercy, until Yori pleads with his father to spare Genchu's life. Hirotomo agrees, but only on the condition that Genchu is to be completely forgotten and never brought up again, except in mentioning that he is a traitor.

Characters

Main characters
Yorikiro Wataro, the hapless hero. Yori is a master of a style so secret and mystical that no one has ever seen it and survived. His style often includes running away and broken swords, but every now and then he reveals a surprisingly high level of combat skill. He is a kind, somewhat naive person. He likes Ina, but is conflicted about the facts of his heritage. His choice of swords relies on their cost rather than quality, so most of them break very easily.
Ina Senshin, the daughter of Masuhiro and Kagome Senshin. She flees home when her engagement to a member of the Wataro clan is announced. This leads her to meet Yori, who saves her from four bandits. She is a strong person who resents the sheltered life she is expected to lead, and often intervenes in fights when Yori seems to be getting the worst of it. She is also apparently a strategic genius, and accomplished the near impossible feat of defeating her uncle at Go while still very young.
Cho Teko, a blind Taoist priest who enjoys spewing absurd proverbs, termed "Choisms" by fans. Cho wields multiple bo staves in combat and first displays his skill while fighting a ninja at the inn that Yori and Ina were staying at. He attaches himself to Ina and Yori shortly thereafter and has traveled with them ever since. Cho is part of a prophecy involving a blind Taoist Priest, a Hindu, and a Christian Priest walking into a Japanese bar, heralding the end of the world, and as such cannot go into any of the said establishments. He is the guiding light of their little band, always optimistic and true to his word. Cho is equal parts sage, warrior, and random comic relief. So far in the comic, Cho's eyes (or, at least, the place where they should reside) have yet to be seen, as they are always obscured, mostly by his pointed hat, but also by other things (up to and including the comic border) when the hat is off.
Kenta "Ken" Daisuke, a rōnin who wields a massive zanbatō sword. His style is none other than the Red Dragon Zanbatou, a reference to Rurouni Kenshin. He tends towards violence, beating up the choicest bystanders for money, forcing his way into Kabuki plays (which he loves, rabidly), etc. He and Yori meet in a showdown, ending with Ken joining them. Ken is the last living member of the Daisuke clan, and wants more than anything to kill General Nataku. Genchu saved his life. He loves alcohol. Just loves it. Can't get enough. Ironically, if 'Daisuke' is pronounced incorrectly, it means 'I love you'.

Wataro Clan
Hirotomo Wataro, Daimyō of the Wataro clan. He is Yori and Eijiro's father. He has systematically crushed all who oppose him. Now he seeks his own son's, Yori's, death. A monster without compare, whose despicable actions are surpassed only by his complete and utter competence — and his favorite color is yellow. (Note: Added at request of subject.) His favorite animals are the fabled Birdfish. He was not always a power-hungry tyrant, however. It is hinted that it was the death of his wife that changed this...
Eijiro Wataro, Yori's arrogant brother. He is devoted to the clan, in contrast to Yori.  He is engaged to Ina.  Ryo was once his personal bodyguard.  It was Eijiro who hired the Izuma to kidnap Masuhiro, as he hates the "inferior" clans and wishes to see them conquered.  He figured that the kidnapping would lead to war.
General Yoshinori Nataku, AKA "Nine Finger Nataku". Nataku seeks only peace, preferably brought about by a long, bloody conflict.  He lives to fight, and personally oversaw the slaughter of Ken's clan, losing his finger to Genchu in the process.  Ken's major motivation in life is to find Nataku and kill him.  A lot.
General Atsumori, Hirotomo's OTHER general/henchman.  He holds the distinction of being one of the calmest characters in the comic, and only the second one with a beard.

Demons of Sorrow
Tadashii, leader of the four Demons of Sorrow, and the clan's finest swordsman after the loss of Genchu.  He trained Yori after Genchu left.  The two men were once good friends, but Tadashii's absolute loyalty to his lord proved stronger than friendship.  His sword represents his family's loyalty to their lord.  Genchu literally clove it in half during his escape, but Tadashii had it reforged.  He is perhaps the least evil of the Demons.  In Japanese, the word tadashii can be interpreted as righteous, truthful, or proper.  However, the word tadashi means, "loyalty to master".
Ryoku, one of the four Demons of Sorrow, and tutor of Eijiro, Yori's brother. Somewhat like an evil version of Cho, although the two have never met.  He joined the Demons of Sorrow knowing that he would one day be called on to kill Yori, as he wished to ensure Eijiro's succession to the throne. Ryoku is blind, but, like Cho, possesses a sort of second sight.  Recently challenged Yori to one final match, where he used an unusual technique involving reflecting sunlight off his sword into his opponent's eyes.  Yori defeated that technique by fighting with his eyes closed, and Ryoku challenged him to an iaidō match in which he was killed. The way he "sees" is somewhat like the way Uonuma Usui, from Rurouni Kenshin, and Daredevil "see" by using superhuman hearing to form a picture in his head, similar to sonar.
Uso, one of the four Demons of Sorrow. While technically a samurai, he makes use of many ninja abilities similar to those of Kakashi Hatake in Naruto. Holds a somewhat petty personality. In Japanese, uso means a lie. He is identified as Uso, the Trickster by Yori in their first encounter.
Honou-ko, one of the four Demons of Sorrow. Wears a thick mask and armor, and has an unhealthy obsession with hellfire, slaughter, and general carnage. He is the most fearsome demon, but the least stable. In the alternate scripts, Honou-ko speaks only in synonyms for blood, death, fire, kill, etc. He is identified as Honou-ko, the Beast by Yori in their first encounter.

Ex.  "Slaughter bloody flame?"  "Rage burning hellfire!" "Blood flesh burning massacre."

Ryoushi, the hunter, a balding man who uses a bow and arrow, and is first introduced in Chapter 18, a flashback chapter. Yori identifies him by name when the Demons of Sorrow band together to ambush him in the Senshin village.

Senshin Clan
Masuhiro Senshin, Ina's father and a skilled samurai. As a daimyō, he is liked and respected by both his peers and his people. He forged an agreement with Hirotmo Wataro to wed Ina to Hirotomo's son in order to restore peace between the clans, but Ina's flight left Masuhiro in a difficult situation. He was captured by the Izuma ninja clan en route to a conference with Hirotomo to explain the situation, and is currently their captive.
Kagome Senshin noh Masamune, Ina's mother. Just like her oldest daughter, only more of a conformist. The other daughters have yet to appear in a speaking role. Believes in her husband, but not her brother, Yukizane.
Yukizane Masamune, Kagome's brother. Has a keen mind and loves to play Go and other games. A skillful tactical commander, but he fears violent death, and prefers diplomatic negotiation to battle. He once won a legendary battle by challenging the enemy general to a battle of Chinese Checkers and winning. His tactics are brilliant, and often lead to a death toll of zero.
Mizuki Masamune, Ina's caretaker. Took care of Ina, as, thanks to her bouncy yet aloof attitude and chronic deafness, was the only one who could stand her complaints. Idly broke the news of her engagement to Ina, and continues to believe that everything is fine. Ina's mother hired Mizuki while drunk.

Izuma Ninja Clan
Suzuka, kunoichi of the Izuma ninja clan. Uses her "female trickery" to foil Masuhiro's numerous escape attempts. She believed that she was hired by Hirotomo, but recently learned that her employer was actually his son, Eijiro. Having fulfilled her contract to him, she is now negotiating to ransom him back to her clan. Suzuka has two lieutenants, also female, named Ayane and Yumiko. Like all Izuma, she is skilled in the use of knock-out-drug-coated-weapons. Suzuka's weapon of choice is a kusarigama, and she is the only blonde in the comic.
Ayane, one of Suzuka's two lieutenants in the Izuma ninja clan. To avenge Bunzo, Ayane was sent with a squad of ninja to kill Yori, but, unfortunately for them, the Demons of Sorrow were also sent to kill him at the same time. The entire squad was slaughtered by Uso and Honou-ko, and Ryo fought her to a draw. Tadashii left her alive to send back to Suzuka with a warning. Ayane wields a set of spiked fans, each one coated in poison or knock-out drugs. She dresses in a very revealing kimono, and paints her face before combat.
Yumiko, one of Suzuka's two lieutenants in the Izuma ninja clan. She is an expert shot, and wields a bow and arrows coated in poison or knock-out drugs, along with a sai in her belt. Yumiko has an eye patch and shoulder armor, and never speaks.
Bunzo, Izuma ninja who uses Rock-jutsu, an "ancient art" which revolves around throwing rocks at his enemies. He attacked the group and, when his first attempts failed, he ran off towards Mount Fuji, announcing his intention to throw it at them. He hasn't been seen since. The ninja clan generally agrees that he is no great loss, but decides to avenge him for reasons of good policy. Bunzo is indirectly mentioned in a newspaper late on, suggesting that he had actually managed to lift Mt. Fuji.

Others
The Wu Tang Brothers, from Cho's monastery in China. When old Master Zhao died, his dying wish was for Cho to take his position. Unfortunately, the Wu Tang brothers, out of a combination of personal greed, desire not to dishonor the monastery, belief that the master was obviously mad in the face of death, and just a general dislike of Cho (Brother Tang once hit him on the head with a spiked club and called it an accident) lied about his dying orders, and took over instead. They told Cho to go as far west as possible, but the Tao (and a hot dog vendor) instead lead him to Japan, where he met Yori and company. Hearing of this, the brothers sought him out to kill him, to prevent both the end of the world and their own loss of power. They carry a case filled with weapons, and Brother Wu can use the legendary Thousand Fists of Fury technique, although the strain of it has caused a compound fracture and internal bleeding within his hand.
Matrix, a mysterious femme fatale. Little is known of her except that she follows the foursome, and so long as Yori lives she avoids attracting their attention. She is an extremely good warrior, and is often described as "too cool to care."  Strangely she possesses several out-of-time items, such as modern clothing and sunglasses, cigarettes, and a medallion with the CND symbol. She has a comrade named Lex who also bears unusual items and takes things much more seriously than her.
Fujio and Fumio, survivors of the quartet of bandits who attacked Ina earlier in the comic. After the death of two of their comrades, they were captured by Suzuka's ninja clan and made a deal with Masuhiro to find Yori and warn him that his father wants him dead. Having delivered their message, they have been pressed into accompanying the group by the force of Ina's personality.
Genchu Wataro Daisuke, a master samurai, said to have been rivaled only by Hirotomo Wataro, who bears two family names. He appears only in flashbacks, and may or may not be dead. Genchu taught Yori before leaving the Wataro clan, and saved Ken's life when Ken was a child. Genchu was also a more skilled warrior than any of the Demons of Sorrow, assembled to kill him. He left the service of Wataro after Wataro decided to destroy the Daisuke clan, and arrived at their castle in time to save the last of them. Years later, he returned and attempted to kill Wataro in a brutal struggle, allowing Yori to take his place. Wataro spared his life at Yori's request, but secretly formed the Demons of Sorrow for the purpose of killing him. They failed, and his current status and whereabouts are both unknown. It is said that Genchu's strong will manifests itself in his fighting ability, which allows him the strength to cleave the weapons of his enemies in two, as seen in his fight against Tadashii.

History
On October 5, 2003, the comic left Keenspace and started a new site, www.noneedforbushido.com.

No Need For Bushido has a history of sporadic updates. At the height of some summers, NNFB could have as many as four updates in a week, all in its full-color style. Less often updates have a history of coming once a month. At of the end of March 2006, NNFB has a twice weekly update of a single page on Mondays an "unofficial" single page on Wednesdays, and often releasing an alternate script on Fridays.

On September 16, No Need for Bushido contributed a page to the Webcomic Hurricane Telethon, hosted by Blank Label Comics.

NNFB reentered the buzzComix Top 100 in September 2005, and is typically high ranking on TWC.

In 2006, early pages were re-written, correcting misspelled words and altering dialogue.

On December 3, 2007, No Need for Bushido moved hosts to Keenspot.

In January 2008, the first issue of No Need for Bushido was released for download at WOWIO.

Recently, due to conflicts with his other work, the artist has moved to a once-every-two weeks schedule, to general fanbase support.

Subcomics and Flash Animations
No Need for Bushido also has a section of subcomics. One section of these subcomics is the NNFB Remix! (formerly called the Alternate Strips), made with existing pages with new dialogue substituted in. These are written by usually Joe, but Alex has also written one of these. Also included in this section are two flash animations using 'Paper-cuts outs' of the NNFB characters. There have been 2 of these made so far. More may be created.

In addition, an April 1, 2006 No Need for Bushido created a parody 'gamer' strip, No Need for a Player's Guide. At first it was an April Fools joke, but now runs as an extra addition to the site. There are currently seven of these in total.

References

External links
No Need For Bushido

2000s webcomics
Anime and manga inspired webcomics
Historical webcomics
Parody webcomics
2002 webcomic debuts
2019 webcomic endings
American comedy webcomics